Cynthia Mort (born June 18, 1956) is an American director, screenwriter, and producer. Mort has worked primarily in television since beginning her career in 1994, writing for the sitcom Roseanne. Her notable works include the HBO series Tell Me You Love Me as a creator and executive producer, the revenge film The Brave One (2007) as a screenwriter, and the biopic Nina (2016) as a director.

Biography 

Mort was born and raised in Detroit, Michigan.

Career

Television 
Mort began her career as a screenwriter in 1994. She wrote multiple episodes for the sitcom Roseanne, and was later a producer on the show. She continued in television as a writer and producer for the program Will and Grace.

In 2007, Mort created and produced the drama Tell Me You Love Me, which aired on HBO, and starred an ensemble cast including Jane Alexander and Adam Scott. The plot of the program closely examines various struggles that may arise in a committed marriage. The series gained notoriety for including highly graphic simulated sexual sequences, to the point that audiences asked whether the actors actually engaged in sexual intercourse on camera. The series ended after one season.

Mort co-wrote a pilot episode for HBO called Tilda in 2011, but experienced conflicts with her co-writer Bill Condon. The project was not picked up as a series.

Writing in film 
Mort, along with Roderick Taylor and Bruce A. Taylor, wrote the screenplay for the 2007 film The Brave One. The film features Jodie Foster as a woman seeking revenge on the men who killed her fiancé.

Nina, controversy, and lawsuit 
In 2016, Mort released her first film as a director, Nina, a biopic chronicling the life of singer Nina Simone. The film elicited a strong negative response from both critics and audiences alike as a result of Mort's choice to cast actress Zoe Saldana in the title role, despite discrepancies between the two women's skin colours. The film and its creators were accused of perpetuating blackface by darkening Saldana's skin to play the role.

Furthermore, the film underwent another controversy in which Mort filed a lawsuit against the producers of Nina in 2014, after finding that choices made by the company compromised her long-standing artistic vision of the film.  As a result, the film was not released for another two years, and while Mort has expressed her support for the project, she maintains that the final result does not properly reflect her work.

Personal life 
Mort is a lesbian. She was involved in a long-term relationship with actress Melanie Mayron and helped raise Mayron's children until their separation in 2008. Mort's personal life garnered attention after the release of The Brave One for her rumoured adulterous romance with actress Jodie Foster, who starred in the film. Both Foster and Mort broke up with their partners and began dating each other, but ended their relationship the following year.

Filmography

Film

Television

See also
 List of female film and television directors
 List of lesbian filmmakers

References

External links 
 

1956 births
Living people
American television directors
American women screenwriters
LGBT film directors
LGBT producers
American women television producers
People from Detroit
Film directors from Michigan
Screenwriters from Michigan
American LGBT writers
American women television directors
21st-century LGBT people
Television producers from Michigan
21st-century American women